James Tully (18 September 1915 – 20 May 1992) was an Irish Labour Party politician and trade unionist. He served as Minister for Defence from 1981 to 1982, Deputy Leader of the Labour Party from 1981 to 1982 and Minister for Local Government from 1973 to 1977. He served as a Teachta Dála (TD) for the Meath constituency from 1954 to 1957 and 1961 to 1982.

A native of Carlanstown, near Kells in County Meath, Tully was educated in Carlanstown schools and in St Patrick's Classical School in Navan. He was elected to Dáil Éireann as a Labour Party TD for the Meath constituency at the 1954 general election. He lost his seat at the 1957 general election, but was re-elected at the 1961 general election and served until 1982. When Labour entered into a coalition government with Fine Gael in 1973, he was appointed Minister for Local Government. While serving in that post he gained prominence for a massive increase in the building of public housing, and notoriety for an attempt to gerrymander Irish constituencies to ensure the re-election of the National Coalition at the 1977 general election. His electoral reorganisation effort via the Electoral (Amendment) Act 1974, which came to be called a "Tullymander", backfired spectacularly and helped engineer a landslide for the opposition, Fianna Fáil. He was regarded as a conservative within the Labour Party, though tended to support party decisions, even if he disagreed with them. For many years he was opposed to coalition, though finding the years in opposition fruitless, he changed his mind and became increasingly in favour of Fine Gael.

Also as Minister for Local government, Tully decided on alterations to the plans for the controversial Dublin Corporation Civic Offices.

Tully was appointed Deputy Leader of the Labour Party under Michael O'Leary in 1981, and Minister for Defence in the short-lived 1981–82 Fine Gael-Labour Party government. In that capacity he traveled to Cairo, in 1981, as Ireland's representative in Egypt's annual 6 October military victory parade. While in the reviewing stand, next to President Anwar Sadat, he suffered a shrapnel injury to his face when Sadat was assassinated by members of Egyptian Islamic Jihad who had infiltrated the Egyptian Army.

In 1982, a few months after the event, James Tully retired from politics. He died ten years later at the age of 76.

References

1915 births
1992 deaths
Labour Party (Ireland) TDs
Members of the 15th Dáil
Members of the 17th Dáil
Members of the 18th Dáil
Members of the 19th Dáil
Members of the 20th Dáil
Members of the 21st Dáil
Members of the 22nd Dáil
People educated at St Patrick's Classical School
Politicians from County Meath
Ministers for Defence (Ireland)
Survivors of terrorist attacks